Bangladeshi animation is a new form of visual arts experiencing a rapid growth. The animation industry employs about 12,000 people in Bangladesh. Most of the animations produced are for outsourced projects from western developed nations. Animation projects related to social awareness programs and TV advertisement purposes are another market, and a few animation studios produce animated shorts and feature films. There are some animation festivals that annually take place in Bangladesh, most prominently the International Animation and Cartoon Festival.

History 
Bangladeshi animation traces its origin in the 1980s when the National Institute of Mass Communications started to offer courses on animation. The first major animation project in Bangladesh was a cartoon series titled Meena, developed as part of some social awareness programs in partnership with UNICEF.  Meena was first released in 1993 and became a household name across Bangladeshi children. In 2000, another animated television series was released titled The Adventures of Montu Miah which became hugely popular within a short time. In 2013, the first edition of International Animation Cartoon Festival Bangladesh, the only major animated film festival in Bangladesh, took place at the Shishu Academy.  The production of the first Bangladeshi animated feature film, titled The Dreamstage, began in 2013 which is set to release in mid-2014.

Magic Puppet Studio is one of the  major private animation studio in Bangladesh which was established in 2015 [www.mpvfx.com] . Cartoon Bangladesh has started its journey since 2008. ToonBangla, a prominent Bangladeshi animation studio was founded in 2005. In 2010, Ogniroth Studio was founded which later became one of the major animation studios in the country.

In 2019, Deepto TV & Cycore Studios produced an animated short film named Tomorrow. It became very popular after its release.

References 

Cartoon Bangladesh produced "Jomider O Dakater Golpo", an animation film.

 
Animation industry